Sobolew  is a village in Garwolin County, Masovian Voivodeship, in east-central Poland. It is the seat of the gmina (administrative district) called Gmina Sobolew.

The village has a population of 2,200.

References

External links
 Jewish Community in Sobolew on Virtual Shtetl

Villages in Garwolin County